Paşabahçe is a neighborhood in Beykoz ilçe (district) of Istanbul Province, Turkey. It is located on the Anatolian side of the Bosphorus.
 
Paşabahçe is a remote settlement in Istanbul. The village was once inhabited only by non-Muslims. Grand vizier Hezarpare Ahmed Pasha (in office 1647–1648) built here a palace-like mansion with a wide yard. Hence the name "Paşabahçe", literally "Pasha's Yard". Later, Sultan Mustafa III (r. 1757-1753) built a school, a mosque, a hamam (Turkish bath) and a fountain in the location, and settled Muslim Turks around the buildings. Even though the Christian population declined over the time, it did not disappear completely. In 1894, a Greek Orthodox church named Agios Konstantinos was built. There is also a holy well ( from ). In the 19th century, there were seven yalıs, waterfront mansions, one mosque, two churches, two bakeries, one mill and a fishing weir. During this period, workshops for glassware, porcelain ware and candle production. The foundation of an alcohol factory in 1922 and a glassware factory in 1934 contributed to the rapid increase of the population in the settlement.

Situated at a bay, Paşabahçe features public parks and restaurants at the seashore. It is popular recreational place for residents of Istanbul.

Paşabahçe is served several times a day by a passenger ferry line between Üsküdar and Anadolukavağı operated by the city passenger ferry lines company "Şehir Hatları".

The name of the place has become a trade mark as "Paşabahçe" for glassware products.

References

Neighbourhoods of Beykoz
Bosphorus